Ya tiene comisario el pueblo is a 1936  Argentine film directed and written by Claudio Martínez Payva.

Main cast
 Paquito Busto
 Arturo Arcari
 Antonio Daglio
 Roberto Fugazot
 Agustín Irusta
 Alberto Puértolas
 Héctor Quintanilla
 Leonor Rinaldi
 Elisardo Santalla
 Atilio Supparo
 Froilán Varela

External links

1936 films
1930s Spanish-language films
Argentine black-and-white films
1930s Argentine films